The Islamic Arts Museum Malaysia is a museum in Kuala Lumpur, Malaysia. It was officially opened on 12 December 1998. The museum is the largest museum of Islamic arts in South East Asia with more than seven thousands artifacts from the Islamic world.

Significance 
The largest Muslim community in the world are inhabitants of the Nusantara region, which is the Indonesian/Malay name for the southern half of Maritime Southeast Asia. The capital of Malaysia, Kuala Lumpur, houses the largest museum for Islamic Art in South East Asia. Although a clear date for the establishment of Islamic communities on the Malay peninsula is difficult to place; the introduction of the faith was likely influenced by busy trade routes between the China Sea and Indian Ocean.

Commonly seen to be on the periphery of the Islamic Art cannon, perhaps due to strong traditions of local visual cultures, scholars have argued that it is time that Indonesia and the rest of the Nusantara region be fully "brought into the main discourse of Islamic Art." Perhaps due to Islam's later arrival in this region, art historians have grappled with defining purely Islamic art within such a dominant visual culture, where overlapping and intersection of aesthetics with other faiths in the region make strict definitions difficult.

Exhibits

The museum consists of twelve gallery spaces, spread over two levels. Level one contains galleries devoted to Architecture, Qur’an and other Manuscripts, and one each for the art of India, China and the Malay Peninsula. Level two houses galleries devoted to Arms & Armor, Textiles, Jewelry and Coins, with the remaining three galleries consisting of art works categorized by their materials  Metal, Wood and Ceramics. The museum is also known for their collection of ancient Islamic glassware.

The museum also houses educational, research, and extensive conservation facilities. One of the most famous permanent exhibitions is a faithfully restored and complete early-nineteenth century "Ottoman Room" dating back to the 19th century. Conservators used data born out of the restoration of this room to collaborate frequently with international colleagues, add to the wider conversation about conserving Islamic vernacular architecture, and to draw attention to the effects on “painted woods in tropical climates such as Southeast Asia.”

Architecture 
The exterior of the 30,000 sq. meter building is defined by clean lines and 21st century construction techniques, yet includes some traditional Islamic architectural details that activate the surface. Such details include the ornate, turquoise-colored tiled domes that recall a textile aesthetic and have established the building as an iconic landmark on the Kuala Lumpur skyline. Likewise, an entrance reminiscent of an Iwan, embellished by Iranian tile workers, continues the tapestry aesthetic, engaging with the surroundings and speaking to the viewer with the incorporation of a welcoming Qur’anic verse.

Awards and recognition

Transportation
The museum is accessible within walking distance west of Kuala Lumpur railway station.

See also
 List of museums in Malaysia

References

Literature

External links

 Official Site
 Tourism Malaysia - Islamic Arts Museum
 Islamic Arts Museum (Muzium Kesenian Islam)

1998 establishments in Malaysia
Art museums and galleries in Kuala Lumpur
Islamic museums in Malaysia
Museums in Kuala Lumpur
Museums established in 1998